Bird Township (T10N R8W) is located in Macoupin County, Illinois, United States. As of the 2010 census, its population was 308 and it contained 135 housing units.

Geography

Adjacent townships
 South Palmyra Township (north)
 South Otter Township (northeast)
 Carlinville Township (east)
 Brushy Mound Township (southeast)
 Polk Township (souths)
 Chesterfield Township (southwest)
 Western Mound Township (west)
 Barr Township (northwest)

Demographics

References

External links
City-data.com
Illinois State Archives

Townships in Macoupin County, Illinois
Townships in Illinois